Pedetes is a genus of rodent, the springhares, in the family Pedetidae. Members of the genus are distributed across southern and Eastern Africa.

Species
A number of species both extant and extinct are classified in the genus Pedetes. They include:
 South African springhare or springhaas (Pedetes capensis)
 East African springhare (Pedetes surdaster)
 Pedetes laetoliensis (Davies, 1987) (Pliocene fossil)

Throughout the 20th century, the living species (and occasionally the prehistoric one) were merged into P. capensis, making the genus monotypic.

Ecology
These rodents are generally nocturnal and sleep through the day in burrows they dig. They feed on foliage, roots and other vegetable matter, and occasionally arthropods. Outside the burrow they usually move around by hopping on their hind legs.

When only one springhare species was recognized, it was listed as vulnerable by the IUCN in 1996 due to an approximately 20% decrease in the population over the previous ten years. This has been caused by intense hunting and the loss of habitat. However, the negative trend has not persisted, and both species are now listed as Species of Least Concern. The coat of these rodents is known to glow a fluorescent color when viewed under black light.

Vocalisations 
This rodent has a range of vocalizations at its disposal. They can grunt and pleat. They also have a piping contact call.

See also
 Hopping mouse – a similar murid rodent native to Australia; an example of parallel evolution
 Jerboa – a similar dipodid rodent native to northern Africa and Asia
 Jumping mouse – a non-desert-dwelling dipodid rodent native to China and North America
 Kangaroo mouse and kangaroo rat – similar heteromyid rodents of North America
 Kultarr – an unrelated marsupial with a similar body plan and coloration; an example of convergence

References

Further reading
Taxonomy browser
Biodiversity Library

 
Rodent genera
Taxa named by Johann Karl Wilhelm Illiger